Jai is a 2004 Indian Tamil-language action film directed by S. Narayan, who had previously worked primarily in Kannada language films. The film stars Prashanth and Anshu, while the former's father Thiagarajan, along with Rajkiran, Bhanupriya, and Rajan P. Dev play supporting roles. A remake of the 2002 Telugu film Aadi, it was produced by Thiagarajan and has music composed by Mani Sharma. Jai was released in January 2004 to negative reviews.

Plot
Nallamuthu meets Veerapandi, his wife, and eight-year-old son Jai returning from the USA after a long gap. Veerapandi's late father was a well-known factionist in that area and owned  of land. While leaving for USA, Veerapandi gave the responsibility of managing this land to Vajravelu. Now back in India, Veerapandi realises that Vajravelu has been misusing his power. He wants to donate all his land to the 2000 families staying in that village. When Vajravelu learns of this impending charity, he attacks Veerapandi, killing him and his wife. Nallamuthu, being a trusted lieutenant of Veerapandi, takes Jai and escapes to the city. After the murders, Veerapandi's trusted people are imprisoned for 14 years.

After 14 years, the now grown up Jai studies in a college and falls in love with Nandhini, who is Vajravelu's daughter. Nallamuthu has raised Jai in Chennai as a fun-loving boy, but he grows up as a hot-tempered young lad. Completing her studies, Nandhini returns to her hometown. Jai comes along with other trusted members of his father who are released from jail. Nallamuthu seeks vengeance on Vajravelu and get back all the land so that he can distribute it to the villagers. The rest of the film deals with how Jai succeeds in avenging his parents.

Cast

Prashanth as Jaya "Jai" Veerapandi
Anshu as Nandhini
Thiagarajan as Veerapandi
Rajkiran as Nallamuthu
Bhanupriya as Veerapandi's wife/Jai's mother
Rajan P. Dev as Vajravelu
Seetha as Vajravelu's wife
Dhamu as College Student
Vaiyapuri as College Student
Sathyan as College Student
Ponnambalam as Karuppu
Devan as Nandhini's uncle
Doddanna as College Principal
Robert as Mohan
Arvind Kathare as Vajravelu's son
Janagaraj
Kuyili 
Shakeela
Pandu
Sukumar
Sharmili
Minnal Deepa
Simran for a dance sequence
Mumaith Khan for a dance sequence
Zabyn Khan for a dance sequence
Nathan Shyam as Nandini's suitor (uncredited)

Production
Thiagarajan purchased the remake rights of the successful of V. V. Vinayak's successful Telugu film Aadi (2002) and signed on R. Madhesh to be the film's director. An initial pre-production poster of the film was reported in the media to have attracted a clash with another film in production during the period, Saamy (2003), which featured Prashanth's paternal cousin Vikram. Madhesh planned Tibet as a potential location to film and began negotiations with international stunt choreographers Sammo Hung and Yuen Woo-ping to have them in the film. However, after filming a song featuring Prashanth and lead actress Simran which was choreographed by Remo D'Souza, he left the project and began work on another film Madhurey, starring Vijay. He was then replaced by Kannada director S. Narayan, who with the venture marked his debut in Tamil cinema. Simran also subsequently left the project and the song which had been shot was converted into an item number, the song was shot at AVM Studios with a set erected costing 1 and half crore with using a technology called Mirror Image. The team then approached Preity Zinta, though the actress was unwilling to commit to star in a Tamil film during the period. Subsequently, the team signed on London based actress Anshu Ambani, who had appeared in the Telugu films Manmadhudu (2002) and Raghavendra (2003). Producer Thiagarajan also made an acting comeback with the film after a long gap with Jai and featured as father to his real life son, Prashanth, while Rajkiran and Rajan P. Dev (who played the role in original film) were signed on for other pivotal roles. The film was briefly put on hold while Prashanth considered starting another project titled Soldier, but plans were shelved and Jai progressed.

The film adapted a Madurai backdrop instead of the Telugu backdrop in the original, although the second schedule was canned in Nanakramguda, Hyderabad. Two songs from the film were shot in Sri Lanka, while stuntmen from Netherlands, Malaysia and Nigeria were selected to be a part of the film.

The film was titled Jai because his successful film Jeans started with a 'J'.

Reception
A critic from Sify called the film "tedious" and added that "all the hype about Jai being big budget extravaganza seems out of place as the story is as old as the hills. Simran's appearance in an item number fails to impress. On the whole Prashanth has to try out something new." Malini Mannath of Chennai Online wrote, "More attention seems to have been paid to the glamour element and the picturisation of the dance numbers than on the rest of the film". Malathi Rangarajan of The Hindu revealed "the ballyhoo for many a scene including the opening one is puzzling because it gives the impression that something big is to follow suit, but nothing of that sort happens". G. Ulaganathan of Deccan Herald said Prashanth "has done justice to his role", but criticised the excessive violence and clichéd plot, and director Narayan "made an appreciable effort".

The film became a box office failure. Post-release, Prashanth noted that as a producer of the film, the team had tried hard but ran into problems to begin with, lamenting that the project had been delayed by a year before filming started and thus the script lost its freshness.

Soundtrack
The film score and the soundtrack were composed by Mani Sharma. The soundtrack, released in 2004, features 6 tracks.

References

External links
 

2004 films
Tamil remakes of Telugu films
Films directed by S. Narayan
2000s masala films
Indian films about revenge
2000s Tamil-language films
Films scored by Mani Sharma
Films shot in Sri Lanka
Films shot in Hyderabad, India